Mauesia submetallica is a species of beetle in the family Cerambycidae. It was described by Martins and Galileo in 2010.

References

Mauesiini
Beetles described in 2010